The British Society for Restorative Dentistry was founded in 1968 and promotes standards in the dental profession through conferences, meetings and scientific literature. The society provides a forum for members to debate current issues in Restorative Dentistry and especially in Prosthodontics.

The conference calendar includes two scientific meetings a year (Spring and Autumn) and the once three- yearly Dental Pan Society meeting. The society is affiliated to the European Journal of Prosthodontics and Restorative Dentistry, and has also published policy documents on ‘Guidelines for Crown and Bridge’ and ‘A Strategy for Planning Restorative Care’.

Award Winners
The British Society for Restorative Dentistry (BSRD) award prizes to clinicians and researchers in three broad domains; audits, research and clinical cases.

References

External links
Official Website
Dental Club Website
Dental Implant Treatment
Smile Makeover

Dental organisations based in the United Kingdom
1968 establishments in the United Kingdom
Organizations established in 1968